The National Center for Genome Resources (NCGR) is a not-for-profit research institute that innovates, collaborates, and educates in the field of genomic data science.

References

Genetics or genomics research institutions
Research institutes in New Mexico
Bioinformatics organizations
Organizations based in New Mexico